The Cape Town Stadium is an association football (soccer) and rugby union stadium in Cape Town, South Africa, that was built for the 2010 FIFA World Cup. During the planning stage, it was known as the Green Point Stadium, which was the name of the older stadium on an adjacent site, and this name was also used frequently during World Cup media coverage. It is the home ground of Premier Soccer League clubs Cape Town Spurs (since 2010) and Cape Town City (since 2016). It has also hosted the South Africa Sevens rugby tournament since 2015.

The stadium is located in Green Point, between Signal Hill and the Atlantic Ocean, close to the Cape Town city center and to the Victoria & Alfred Waterfront, a popular tourist and shopping venue. The stadium had a seating capacity of 64,100 during the 2010 World Cup, later reduced to 58,309. The stadium is connected to the waterfront by a new road connection, Granger Bay Boulevard.  Cape Town Stadium is the 5th biggest stadium in South Africa; the biggest in Cape Town.

Etymology

During construction, Cape Town Stadium was unofficially known as Green Point Stadium, the name of an older stadium adjacent to it that was partially demolished and rebuilt into the Green Point Athletics Stadium. During October 2009, the city asked for the public to propose names for the new stadium and the name Cape Town Stadium was chosen.

In December 2017, plans for a new name were underway.

Previous stadium

The stadium is adjacent to the site of the original 18,000 seater stadium Green Point Stadium. It replaces a portion of the Metropolitan Golf Club site which has now been realigned.

The previous stadium, originally constructed in 1897 and which was partly demolished in 2007 and rebuilt in 2013 as the Green Point Athletics Stadium, was a multi-purpose stadium used for cycling, athletics, cricket and soccer. Later used mainly for soccer matches, it was the home ground of Santos Football Club and Ajax Cape Town at different points. It also hosted music concerts, including the November 2003 46664 Concert for the benefit of AIDS victims. The section of the old stadium that remained was redeveloped into the Green Point Athletics Stadium, which opened in 2015 with a seating capacity of 4500.

Design
Construction of the Cape Town Stadium, located on the Green Point Common, began in March 2007.

In 33 months, joint venture contractors Murray & Roberts, now known as Concor and WBHO completed the project at a cost of R4.4billion – or approximately US$600million.

The project architects were an association between GMP Architects of Germany and two local firms, Louis Karol and Associates and Point Architects.

The structural engineers comprised a joint venture between BKS, Henry Fagan & Partners, KFD Wilkinson, Goba, Iliso and Arcus Gibb.

Handing over

Cape Town Stadium was officially handed over to the City of Cape Town on schedule on 14 December 2009. At a ceremony in front of over 200 invited guests and the media representatives from around the world, Cape Town Executive Mayor Alderman Dan Plato, received the keys to the stadium officially confirming the opening of Cape Town Stadium.

After the World Cup
A consortium consisting of South Africa's Sail Group and French-based Stade de France were awarded the service contract to operate the stadium and ensure that it remains a sustainable multi-purpose venue after the 2010 FIFA World Cup. The consortium, called Business Venture Investments 1317, was involved in the management of the stadium from January 2009 onwards. The city municipality paid the consortium to manage the stadium up to and during the World Cup, after which the consortium will lease the stadium from the city for a period of not less than 10 years and not more than 30 years.

Following the World Cup, temporary rows of seating on either side on the top tier were replaced by events suites and clubrooms, reducing the stadium's capacity to 58,300. The stadium features corporate hospitality suites, medical, training, and conferencing and banqueting facilities. The consortium will operate the stadium as well as manage and maintain the defined areas of the surrounding urban park and sport precinct on the 85-hectare Greenpoint Common from stadium revenue.

Ajax Cape Town have used the stadium as their home ground from the 2010-11 Premier Soccer League (PSL) season onwards. Due to the stadium's ongoing financial problems, the City of Cape Town had sought to acquire Western Province rugby as an "anchor tenant". After four years of talks, Western Province announced in December 2014 that they had decided to remain at Newlands Stadium. In March 2015, the South African Rugby Union announced that the South Africa Sevens tournament would be staged at Cape Town Stadium for four years, beginning in December 2015.

In June 2016, it was announced that new PSL club Cape Town City would also play at Cape Town Stadium.

In late 2020, Western Province RFU announced that they were selling their longtime home of Newlands Stadium to developers, who planned to demolish the ground and convert it to a mixed-use development. From 2021 onwards, franchise rugby team Stormers and Currie Cup side WP will call Cape Town Stadium home, as will international rugby tests played in Cape Town.

Inaugural games

The first game to be hosted at the new Cape Town Stadium was a Cape Town derby between Ajax Cape Town and Santos on 23 January 2010 as part of the official inauguration of the stadium. Only 20,000 tickets were made available for the event and were sold out by Friday 15 January 2010. The Soccer Festival had entertainment from local band Freshlyground and a Vuvuzela orchestra performance during half time.

The second of three 'dry runs' at the new Cape Town Stadium was another Cape Town derby. Local Cape Town rugby teams, The Vodacom Stormers and the Boland Inv. XV battled it out at the Cape Town Rugby Festival that took place on 6 February 2010. The Rugby Festival had entertainment from local band Flat Stanley. Only 40,000 tickets were made available for the event. This was double the amount that attended the Soccer Festival.

Cape Town Stadium hosted its third test event on Monday 22 March, during which all 55,000 permanent seats were available for the first time. A total of 52,000 tickets were sold.

‘Cape Town For Jesus', a religious gathering addressed by South African evangelist Angus Buchan, was the first major non-sporting event hosted at the stadium, and gave the stadium operators another chance to test their readiness ahead of the 2010 FIFA World Cup.

Cape Town Stadium hosted its fourth and final test event on Saturday 10 April. This was the first time that the stadium was utilised at night, for the International Under-20 Soccer Challenge between South Africa, Brazil, Nigeria and Ghana. About 40,000 attended the event that tested the stadium's readiness for the 2010 FIFA World Cup.

2010 FIFA World Cup
In the 2010 FIFA World Cup, Cape Town Stadium hosted five first round matches, one second round, one quarter-final, and one semi-final. During the World Cup, all FIFA media referred to the stadium as 'Green Point Stadium'.

Matches

International friendlies 
On 17 November 2010, the Cape Town Stadium hosted its first international friendly. The match was between South Africa and the USA, where they played for the Nelson Mandela Challenge Trophy.

Sporting and events

There was speculation of a possible move of the Super rugby team Stormers to the Cape Town Stadium. However, the Stormers have since continued playing at Newlands Stadium, which is owned by the Western Province Rugby Football Union.

World Rugby Sevens Series
See also World Rugby Sevens Series

2022 Rugby World Cup Sevens
It will take place between 9 and 11 September 2022.

Tennis

See also Match for Africa
The sixth edition took place on 7 February 2020 in Cape Town, South Africa and featured Roger Federer and Rafael Nadal. Federer confirmed the date, location, and opponent during the 2019 edition of Wimbledon. Federer said he had pursued Nadal's participation for two years before a date as agreed upon. South Africa is the birth country of Federer's mother and the focus of his charitable foundation. The doubles match consisted Roger Federer and Bill Gates versus Rafael Nadal and Trevor Noah, host of The Daily Show. Federer and Gates won the match 6–4. In singles, Federer beat Nadal with the score 6–4, 3–6, 6–3. The event was attended by 51,954 people (the highest attendance ever recorded at a tennis match) and more than $3.5 million was raised in aid of children's education in Africa.

Concerts

Movies
Cape Town Stadium was featured in the film Safe House (2012). The stadium also features in many local advertising and print media campaigns.

Incidents
On 7 November 2012, shortly before the U.S. rock band Linkin Park was set to perform at the sold-out stadium, gusts of wind caused advertising scaffolding outside the stadium to collapse onto a crowd of people injuring 19 and killing 1; of the 19 injured, 12 were taken to hospital for further treatment.

Calls for demolition
Several individuals and groups have called for the stadium to be demolished due to its under-utilization after the World Cup. Effective utilization and use of the stadium is thus a political issue in the city.

References

External links

 Cape Town Stadium 
 Cape Town Stadium City of Cape Town FIFA 2010 website
 Cape Town Stadium Cape Town Tourism website
Photos of Stadiums in South Africa at cafe.daum.net/stade
 360 View
 360 degree Virtual Tour (5 locations)  360SouthAfrica

Soccer venues in South Africa
Sports venues in Cape Town
Sports venues completed in 2009
Cape Town Spurs F.C.
2010 FIFA World Cup stadiums
Music venues in South Africa
Gerkan, Marg and Partners buildings
Rugby union stadiums in South Africa
Cape Town City F.C. (2016)
World Rugby Sevens Series venues
21st-century architecture in South Africa